Şıxlı (also, Shekili) is a village in the Goychay Rayon of Azerbaijan.  The villages forms part of the municipality of Mallı-Şıxlı.

References 

Populated places in Goychay District